Priscilla Hertati Lumban Gaol (born May 16, 1988) is an Indonesian martial artist who has represented the country in various international competitions, including in the 2014 Asian Games, where she competed in wushu, and in the 2019 SEA Games, where she competed in kickboxing.

She signed a contract with ONE Championship and made her debut in February 2017. She competes in the women’s atomweight division and is known by her nickname "Thathi".

Early life 
Gaol was born in Dolok Sanggul, North Sumatra, to ethnic Batak parents W. Lumban Gaol and Rebecca Manullang. She is the second child of six siblings. Priscilla currently lives in Jakarta.

Gaol started to learn martial arts in 2006, when her older brother introduced her to wushu. Her parents initially refused to allow her to pursue a career in martial arts and demanded she be an office worker.

Martial arts career

Early career 
Gaol first competed in wushu sanda in the 2008 Indonesia National Games. At the 2012 Indonesia National Games, she won a bronze medal in wushu.

She won a bronze medal in the 2013 Wushu World Championships' women 52 kg category in Kuala Lumpur, Malaysia.

She won the national kickboxing championships back to back in 2018 and 2019 to secure her place in the national team for the 2019 SEA Games.

ONE Championship 
She suffered losses in her first two professional matches in the promotion and earned her first win in January 2018 in Jakarta when she fought against Audreylaura Boniface Raphael of Malaysia at One Championship: Kings Of Courage. She went to win a total of five bouts that year out of six fights she had, which made her the busiest athlete of the year.

She has collected seven wins throughout her stint in the promotion, with most recently, she defeated Bozhena Antoniyar via a unanimous decision in Jakarta. After the bout, Gaol said she was looking towards the possibility of challenging Angela Lee's ONE Atomweight Championship belt.

Gym affiliation 
Gaol represents Siam Training Camp

Mixed martial arts record 

|-
| Loss
| align=center|7–5
| Meng Bo
| KO (punches)
| ONE Championship: Inside the Matrix 2
| 
| align=center|1
| align=center|1:26
| Kallang, Singapore
| 
|-
|-
| Win
| align=center|7–4
| Bozhena Antoniyar
| Decision (unanimous)
| ONE Championship: Dawn Of Valor
| 
| align=center|3
| align=center|5:00
| Jakarta, Indonesia
| 
|-
| Win
| align=center| 6–4
| Nou Srey Pov
| Decision (unanimous)
| ONE Championship: For Honor
|
| align=center| 3
| align=center| 5:00
|Jakarta, Indonesia
| 
|-
| Loss
| align=center| 5–4
| Puja Tomar
| Decision (split)
| ONE Championship: Eternal Glory
| 
| align=center| 3
| align=center| 5:00
| Jakarta, Indonesia
| 
|-
| Win
| align=center| 5–3
| Angelie Sabanal
| Decision (unanimous)
| ONE Championship: Warrior's Dream
| 
| align=center| 3
| align=center| 5:00
| Jakarta, Indonesia
| 
|-
| Win
| align=center| 4–3
| Jomary Torres
| Decision (unanimous)
| ONE Championship: Conquest of Heroes
| 
| align=center| 3
| align=center| 5:00
| Jakarta, Indonesia
| 
|-
| Loss
| align=center| 3–3
| Jihin Radzuan
| Decision (unanimous)
| ONE Championship: Pursuit of Power
| 
| align=center| 3
| align=center| 5:00
| Kuala Lumpur, Malaysia
|
|-
| Win
| align=center| 3–2
| Rome Trinidad
| Submission (guillotine choke)
| ONE Championship: Grit & Glory
| 
| align=center| 1
| align=center| 2:27
| Jakarta, Indonesia
|
|-
| Win
| align=center| 2–2
| Krisna Limbaga
| Submission (scarf hold armlock)
| ONE Championship: Quest for Gold
| 
| align=center| 1
| align=center| 4:05
| Yangon, Myanmar
|
|-
| Win
| align=center| 1-2
| Audreylaura Boniface Raphaeil
| TKO (punches)
| ONE Championship: Kings of Courage
| 
| align=center| 1
| align=center| 3:23
| Jakarta, Indonesia
|
|-
| Loss
| align=center| 0–2
| Gina Iniong
| TKO (punches)
| ONE Championship: Legends of the World
| 
| align=center| 2
| align=center| 2:12
| Manila, Philippines
|
|-
| Loss
| align=center| 0–1
| Tiffany Teo
| Decision (unanimous)
| ONE Championship: Throne of Tigers
| 
| align=center| 3
| align=center| 5:00
| Kuala Lumpur, Malaysia
|
|-

See also 

 List of female mixed martial artists

References 

Indonesian female kickboxers
Indonesian female mixed martial artists
Mixed martial artists utilizing sanshou
Sportspeople from North Sumatra
Batak people
1988 births
Living people
Competitors at the 2019 Southeast Asian Games
Wushu practitioners at the 2014 Asian Games
Asian Games competitors for Indonesia
Indonesian sanshou practitioners
Southeast Asian Games competitors for Indonesia